In classical scholarship, the editio princeps (plural: editiones principes) of a work is the first printed edition of the work, that previously had existed only in manuscripts, which could be circulated only after being copied by hand. 

For example, the editio princeps of Homer is that of Demetrius Chalcondyles, now thought to be from 1488. The most important texts of classical Greek and Roman authors were for the most part produced in editiones principes in the years from 1465 to 1525, following the invention of the printing press around 1440.

In some cases there were possibilities of partial publication, of publication first in translation (for example from Greek to Latin), and of a usage that simply equates with first edition. For a work with several strands of manuscript tradition that have diverged, such as Piers Plowman, editio princeps is a less meaningful concept.

The term has long been extended by scholars to works not part of the Ancient Greek and Latin literatures. It is also used for legal works, and other significant documents.

For full lists of literature works, see:

 Editio princeps (Latin)
 Editio princeps (Greek)
 Editio princeps (other languages)

Notable works
The following is a list of notable literature works.

References

Book terminology
Textual criticism
Textual scholarship
History of printing